The Sandusky Automobile Company was an automobile manufacturer in Sandusky, Ohio, from 1902 to 1904. It was located at 1114 Camp Street.

History
The Sandusky Automobile Company was founded by James J. Hinde who "had been a successful paper manufacturer who entered the automobile business with the belief that a small, reasonably priced car could capture a mass market."

This concept influenced Henry Ford.  The Lucas County/Maumee Valley Historical Society concluded that "the Sandusky Automobile Company may be far more significant because of the passing interest of Henry Ford than for the number of cars they built and sold. At the time Ford was not yet a manufacturing magnate. He was a successful engineer turned inventor, who had given up his profession to enter the automotive field."  Although the company did not succeed, James J. Hinde made "conceptual contributions" to "the production strategy of Henry Ford."

Models 
The company made an open runabout car, seating two people. The 1903 model had a "piano-box body, and a rounded bonnet front on top of the dash", with a 5-horsepower single-cylinder engine water-cooled by natural gravity circulation. Power was transmitted to the rear axle by two chains. This car was exhibited at the New York Automobile Show at Madison Square Garden in 1903.

The 1904 model had a one-cylinder, 7 hp, water-cooled engine, a planetary transmission and a sliding gear suspension. It had a 65" wheelbase. One version,  called the Sandusky, was advertised at $650, in a review of 88 current models in Frank Leslie's Popular Monthly.

Sandusky also made a somewhat more expensive car, the Courier, with similar specifications, but a steering wheel instead of a steering lever. The 1904 model was advertised at $800, and at $700. The engine was one-cylinder and 7 horsepower, with a transmission that had two forward speeds and reverse.

References

See also
List of defunct United States automobile manufacturers

Defunct motor vehicle manufacturers of the United States
Motor vehicle manufacturers based in Ohio
1902 establishments in Ohio
Vehicle manufacturing companies established in 1902
Vehicle manufacturing companies disestablished in 1905
Veteran vehicles
1900s cars
Cars introduced in 1902